Phalaenopsis sumatrana is a species of orchid native to peninsular Thailand, Vietnam and southern Sumatra.

Description

Phalaenopsis sumatrana is a medium-sized, monopodial, epiphytic orchid. It has a short stem, usually singular, covered with large overlapping oval leaves. The flowers are mildly fragrant, with waxy or fleshy petals and sepals, and of somewhat variable color. They appear in the spring through fall, borne on stems (inflorecences) about 12" long, with bracts spaced along their length. From each of the bracts sprouts a single flower, with the multiple flowers lined up along the end of the inflorescence.

Taxonomy
It is one of the parent species of the natural hybrids Phalaenopsis × singuliflora and Phalaenopsis × gersenii.

Habitat
This species is found in lowland forests at elevations of 600 to 700 meters.

References

External links
 
 

sumatrana
Orchids of Sumatra
Orchids of Thailand
Orchids of the Philippines
Orchids of Vietnam
Plants described in 1860